Manshuiwan railway station(漫水湾站) is a railway station on Chengkun railway, China.

The station is located in Mianning County, Sichuan province, initially built in 1970, managed by the Xichang branch of Chengdu Railway Bureau. It has a dedicated railway to Xichang Satellite Launch Center.

Railway stations in China opened in 1970
Railway stations in Sichuan